Eilema peyrierasi is a moth of the subfamily Arctiinae. It was described by Hervé de Toulgoët in 1976. It is found on Madagascar.

Description 
Eilema peyrierasi has a wingspan of approximately 25mm. The forewings are brownish-grey with black spots and markings, and the hindwings are light brown with a darker brown border.

Distribution 
Eilema peyrierasi is found only in Madagascar, where it is known from a few localities in the eastern rainforest.

Ecology 
The larvae of Eilema peyrierasi feed on the leaves of various plant species, including Coffea, Citrus, and Solanum. The adults are nocturnal and are attracted to light.

Conservation 
There is currently no conservation status for Eilema peyrierasi, but like many species in Madagascar, it is threatened by habitat destruction.

References

 

peyrierasi
Moths described in 1976